Laurens Meintjes (9 June 1868 – 30 March 1941) was a South African track cyclist and winner of the inaugural stayers contest at the 1893 ICA Track Cycling World Championships in Chicago. This victory made him the first African to win a world championship. Meintjes was born in Aberdeen and died in Potgietersrust.

References

External links

1868 births
1941 deaths
People from Dr Beyers Naudé Local Municipality
Cape Colony people
South African Republic people
Afrikaner people
South African male cyclists
UCI Track Cycling World Champions (men)
South African track cyclists